The 1962–63 season was Mansfield Town's 25th season in the Football League and 3rd in the Fourth Division, they finished in 4th position with 57 points, gaining promotion on goal average.

Final league table

Results

Football League Fourth Division

FA Cup

League Cup

Squad statistics
 Squad list sourced from

References
General
 Mansfield Town 1962–63 at soccerbase.com (use drop down list to select relevant season)

Specific

Mansfield Town F.C. seasons
Mansfield Town